Cue TV was a regional television station in New Zealand which started in October 1996 as Mercury Television. The majority of its programming was from the Southern Institute of Technology (SIT2LRN), who used the channel as a nationwide local educational television service. Most of the non-educational programming on Cue TV was locally produced, with the remainder being from international sources like Deutsche Welle. The channel was available nationwide, on Freeview, Sky and Telstra.

From July 2012, Cue TV was New Zealand's only nationwide locally produced educational television service, due to the closing of TVNZ 7. Because Cue TV was still a devoted Southland broadcaster, it was not often referred to as a National public service.

History

The channel was launched in October 1995, as Mercury TV. It was the last regional broadcaster in New Zealand to be awarded a VHF licence, with all new stations from that point on broadcasting on UHF. The original majority shareholder in Mercury TV was the CRT (Combined Rural Traders) co-operative, before the station was sold to Family Television Network and then West Media 175, a company based in the United Kingdom with New Zealand broadcasting assets.

In 2003, after General Manager Tom Conroy purchased the station, the station was rebranded as Southland TV and went nationwide when it launched on the Sky Digital network on Channel 90. In March 2007 Southland TV was rebranded as CUE 110, the name change coincided with Sky TV relocating most of their channels on the Sky Digital network.

In December 2007, Cue TV became available on the Freeview platform making it available on VHF, as well as both of the main digital platforms in New Zealand.

Around 50% of the programming revolved around SIT2LRN multimedia distance learning provided by the Southern Institute of Technology. In addition the station broadcast a local bulletin of news, weather, lifestyle and sport each weeknight called South Today, live talkback and programmes from various other regional stations. International content was mainly provided via satellite from Deutsche Welle in Germany.

Cue TV simulcast on VHF 5 in the Invercargill region, broadcasting from their transmitter on Forest Hill. The signal was prone to interference, especially during winter, and ongoing problems with the transmitter itself made receiving the channel from Sky Digital (or Freeview) the preferred choice.

In February 2013 Cue TV began broadcasting on Freeview HD channel 23 in Southland in preparation for the digital switch over. On 28 April 2013 the analogue service was to have been switched off for the entire South Island of New Zealand, but Cue remained broadcasting on VHF channel 5 for a few days, making the station the last analogue television broadcast in the South Island.

On March 31, 2015 an announcement was made that CUE would cease broadcasting on April 10, 2015 however the company would remain in operation switching its focus to a production company producing content for other stations.

See also
 Lounge TV

References

External links
 Official Site

Television stations in New Zealand
Defunct television channels in New Zealand
Television channels and stations established in 1996
Television channels and stations disestablished in 2015
English-language television stations in New Zealand